Shirley Breeden (born 1955) is an American politician who served as a member of the Nevada Senate for the 5th district from 2009 to 2012.

Early life and education 
Breeden was born in Needles, California and raised in Las Vegas. After graduating from Ed W. Clark High School, she attended the College of Southern Nevada and took business courses at the University of Nevada, Las Vegas.

Career 
Breeden was elected to the Nevada Senate in 2008, narrowly defeating incumbent Republican Joe Heck. She was the plaintiff in the Supreme Court Case Clark County School Dist. v. Breeden.

External links
Nevada State Legislature - Senator Shirley Breeden official government website
Shirley Breeden for State Senator official campaign website
Project Vote Smart - Senator Shirley Breeden (NV) profile

Democratic Party Nevada state senators
Living people
College of Southern Nevada alumni
People from the Las Vegas Valley
Women state legislators in Nevada
People from Needles, California
1955 births
21st-century American women